Georges Paulais (16 September 1884 – 12 December 1967) was a French film actor. He appeared in more than 140 films between 1910 and 1956. He was born in Guimps, Charente, France and died in Chabanais, Charente, France.

Selected filmography

 Le droit à la vie (1917)
 The Zone of Death (1917)
 El Dorado (1921)
 The Lady of Lebanon (1926)
 Change of Heart (1928)
 The Divine Voyage (1929)
 Saint Joan the Maid (1929)
 Accused, Stand Up! (1930)
 Departure (1931)
 Prince Jean (1934)
 Gold in the Street (1934)
 Rothchild (1934)
 The Bread Peddler (1934)
 Les yeux noirs (1935)
 The Brighton Twins (1936)
 27 Rue de la Paix (1936)
 Moutonnet (1936)
 Beethoven's Great Love (1937)
 The Red Dancer (1937)
 The Secrets of the Red Sea (1937)
 Rasputin (1938)
 Princess Tarakanova (1938)
 Ultimatum (1938)
 Sacred Woods (1939)
 Immediate Call (1939)
 Whirlwind of Paris (1939)
 Vidocq (1939)
 His Uncle from Normandy (1939)
 Radio Surprises (1940)
 The Black Diamond (1941)
 Mahlia the Mestiza (1943)
 The Midnight Sun (1943)
 A Cage of Nightingales (1945)
 The Queen's Necklace (1946)
 Special Mission (1946)
 The Royalists (1947)
 Impeccable Henri (1948)
 The Woman I Murdered (1948)
 The Secret of Monte Cristo (1948)
 Doctor Laennec (1949)
 Dark Sunday (1948)
 Bed for Two; Rendezvous with Luck (1950)
 Quay of Grenelle (1950)
 Sending of Flowers (1950)
 Rome Express (1950)
 Julie de Carneilhan (1950)
 Alone in the World (1952)
 The Lottery of Happiness (1953)

References

External links

1884 births
1967 deaths
French male film actors
French male silent film actors
20th-century French male actors